Continental American is the third studio album by Peter Allen, released in 1974. The album was his first for A&M Records, and is notable for the inclusion of Allen's version of his co-authored hit for Olivia Newton-John, among others, "I Honestly Love You".

History
Allen's previous two studio albums, Peter Allen (1971) and Tenterfield Saddler (1972) had been released on Metromedia Records, with modest results. Prior to the release of Continental American, Allen had assumed residency in New York City and had become a regular performer at the Reno Sweeney nightclub, owned and operated by composer Lewis Friedman between 1972 and 1977. A portrait of Allen, taken at Reno Sweeney's, is featured on the back cover of Continental American.

The album was later described by critic William Ruhlmann as involving a "retrospective, world-weary concept" and a "mood of desperate nostalgia", concluding that the album was "a dour singer/songwriter collection that used show business clichés in music and words to express a world view of regret and resignation."

Metromedia Records had ceased operations as of 1974, resulting in Allen's earlier albums becoming largely unavailable. He used the Continental American and later A&M releases as an opportunity to reintroduce some of his music. "Just Ask Me I've Been There", was originally recorded on the Tenterfield Saddler album. "Harbour", included on his follow-up Taught by Experts album (1976), was also originally from Tenterfield Saddler.

Track listing

Side One
"Just a Gigolo (Schöner Gigolo)" (Irving Caesar, Leonello Casucci, Julius Brammer) 3:14
"Everything Old Is New Again" (Peter Allen, Sager) 2:35
"The Natural Thing to Do" (Allen, Sager) 4:11
"Pretty, Pretty" (Allen, Hal Hackady) 3:32
"Continental American" (Allen, Sager) 5:15

Side Two
"Just Ask Me I've Been There" (Allen) 4:35
"I Honestly Love You" (Allen, Jeff Barry) 3:32
"This Side Show's Leaving Town" (Allen, Sager) 7:38
"Just a Gigolo (Schöner Gigolo)" (Reprise) (Caesar, Casucci) 3:15

Personnel

Peter Allen - keyboards, percussion, vocals
Julien Barber - viola
Seymour Berger - trombone
Alfred Brown - viola
Garnett Brown - trombone
Sam T. Brown - guitar
James Buffington - French horn
Francisco Centeno - bass
Arthur Clark - saxophone
Selwart Clarke - violin
Harry Cykman - violin
Joseph DeAngelis - French horn
Jonathan Dorn - tuba
Sue Evans - percussion
Jon Faddis - trumpet
Jeff Fura - project coordinator
Steve Gadd - drums
Paul Gershman - violin
Peter Gordon - French horn
Emanuel Green - violin
John Gruhler - project coordinator
Anthony Jackson - bass
Jack Jeffers - trombone
Arthur Jenkins - keyboards
Jack Jennings - percussion
Howard Johnson - tuba
Walter Kane - saxophone
Harry Kohn - violin
Barry Korkin - project coordinator
Phil Kross - percussion
Beverly Lauridsen - cello
Charles Libove - violin
Bob Liftin - engineer
Harry Lookofsky - violin
Keith Loving - guitar
Ralph MacDonald - percussion
Joseph Malin - violin
Dawn Maze - project coordinator
Daniel Moore - trumpet
Kermit Moore - cello
David Nadien - violin
Gene Orloff - violin
Romeo Penque - clarinet
Seldon Powell - clarinet, saxophone
Matthew Raimondi - violin
George Ricci - cello
Ernie Royal - trumpet
Bill Salter - bass guitar 
Sol Schlinger - saxophone
Billy Slapin - clarinet, flute, saxophone
Andrew Smith - drums
David Spinozza - guitar
Marvin Stamm - trumpet
Tony Studd - euphonium
Richard Tee - keyboards
Brooks Tillotson - French horn
John Tropea - guitar
Emanuel Vardi - viola
Harold Vick - saxophone
Bill Watrous - trombone
Frank Wess - flute, saxophone
Joseph B. Wilder - trumpet

Charts
The album entered the Australian top 100 in October 1977.

References

1974 albums
A&M Records albums
Peter Allen (musician) albums
Albums produced by Joel Dorn